Kawkawlin Township is a civil township of Bay County in the U.S. state of Michigan. The township's population was 4,848 as of the 2010 census. It is included in the Bay City Metropolitan Statistical Area.

Communities
The township has four Unincorporated communities within its borders:
Brissette Beach is located on Brissette Beach Road between the Saginaw Bay shoreline and Tobico Marshes. (Elevation: 587 ft./179 m.)
Linwood on the border with Fraser Township.
Linwood Beach is at Cottage Grove Road and Linwood Beach Road and the Saginaw Bay shoreline. (Elevation: 584 ft. /178 m.)
Three Churches Corner is off Interstate 75 at Fraser and Beaver roads. (Elevation:  607 ft./185 m.)

The community of Kawkawlin is not in Kawkawlin Township, but just south of the Kawkawlin River and the southern border of the township in Monitor Township.

Geography

Demographics
As of the census of 2000, there were 5,104 people, 1,910 households, and 1,457 families residing in the township. The racial makeup of the township was 96.47% White, 0.47% African American, 0.57% Native American, 0.25% Asian, 0.61% from other races, and 1.63% from two or more races. Hispanic or Latino of any race were 2.29% of the population.

There were 1,910 households, out of which 32.5% had children under the age of 18 living with them, 63.6% were married couples living together, 8.2% had a female householder with no husband present, and 23.7% were non-families. 20.1% of all households were made up of individuals, and 8.0% had someone living alone who was 65 years of age or older.  The average household size was 2.62 and the average family size was 3.01.

In the township the population was spread out, with 24.3% under the age of 18, 7.5% from 18 to 24, 27.6% from 25 to 44, 27.0% from 45 to 64, and 13.6% who were 65 years of age or older.  The median age was 39 years. For every 100 females, there were 98.3 males.  For every 100 females age 18 and over, there were 94.9 males.

The median income for a household in the township was $43,951, and the median income for a family was $49,750. Males had a median income of $40,401 versus $22,941 for females. The per capita income for the township was $20,648.  About 3.8% of families and 4.9% of the population were below the poverty line, including 6.1% of those under age 18 and 5.8% of those age 65 or over.

Organizations
Blessing the Children International is a 501(c)(3) non-profit organization based in Kawkawlin. The organization does Christian missionary work in Ethiopia.

References

External links
Kawkawlin Township official website

Townships in Bay County, Michigan
Townships in Michigan
Populated places on Lake Huron in the United States